The Menaced Assassin is a 1927 oil on canvas painting by Belgian surrealist artist René Magritte.

The main subject of the painting is a blood-smeared nude woman, seen lying on a couch. The assassin of the painting's title, a well-dressed man, stands ready to leave, his coat and hat on a chair next to his bag. He is however delayed by the sound of music, and in an unhurriedly relaxed manner, listens to a gramophone. In the meantime, two men armed with club and net wait in the foyer to ensnare him, as three more men also watch from over the balcony.
It is said that the gramophone is replaying the screams of the murdered woman. Outside, we can see snowy mountains. It is a simple painting at first glance, typical of Magritte and surrealist art in general.

References

Paintings by René Magritte
Surrealist paintings
Paintings in the collection of the Museum of Modern Art (New York City)
1927 paintings
Paintings about death